Frooti is a mango-flavoured drink sold in India. It is made with natural flavours and mango-concentrate. It is the flagship product and most successful drink product made by Parle Agro. Frooti was launched in 1985 in Tetra Pak packaging, and is now also sold in PET bottles and rectangular shaped packs. Frooti is exported to the United States, Canada, the United Kingdom, the United Arab Emirates, Saudi Arabia, Malaysia, Maldives, Singapore, Thailand, New Zealand, Australia, Mozambique, Ghana, Malawi, Zambia, Nigeria, Tanzania, Japan, and Ireland.

History

Frooti was launched in a green rectangular Tetra Pak as a ready-to-serve mango drink. Frooti was not the first mango drink, but quickly won a large market share, with 25.6% of market share as of June 2020.

The tagline "Mango Frooti, Fresh and Juicy", was created by the marketing duo of Arun Lahori and GM Menon, whose brief as the brand's communications agency was to "make mango Frooti synonymous with freshness and juiciness". Other slogans used by the brand have included: "Fresh and juicy got to be Frooti", and "Juice Up your Life". 

The drink has been advertised by Allu Arjun, Alia Bhatt, and Shah Rukh Khan. The brand spent 40% more on its marketing in 2013.

Ingredients

The drink contains mango pulp, water, sugar, citric acid, ascorbic acid, salt, colouring and flavouring. Frooti contains 33.7 grams of sugar per 250 mL.

Packaging
A consumer study indicated that consumers wanted a recap bottle, which did not previously exist in the mango drink segment. In response, Parle Agro launched Frooti in a hygienic hot fill PET bottle. Frooti is now available in various sizes of PET bottles, including 200 mL, 250 mL, 500 mL, 600 mL, 1.2 L and 2 L.

References

Indian drink brands
Juice brands